Anthony Glenn Tucker (born April 4, 1969) is an American former professional basketball player. He played one season in the National Basketball Association (NBA) as a member of the Washington Bullets after signing with the team as an undrafted free agent. He attended Georgetown University his freshman year before transferring to Wake Forest University for his final three years.

Tucker played for the Florida Beachdogs of the Continental Basketball Association (CBA) during the 1996–97 season. He was named as the CBA Newcomer of the Year and selected to the All-Defensive Team.

References

External links

1969 births
Living people
American expatriate basketball people in Italy
American expatriate basketball people in Turkey
American men's basketball players
Baltimore Bayrunners players
Basket Rimini Crabs players
Basketball players from Washington, D.C.
Fabriano Basket players
Florida Beachdogs players
Georgetown Hoyas men's basketball players
La Crosse Bobcats players
Small forwards
Undrafted National Basketball Association players
Viola Reggio Calabria players
Washington Bullets players
Wake Forest Demon Deacons men's basketball players